Mansoura is a town and commune, and the capital of  Mansoura District, in Ghardaïa Province, Algeria. According to the 2008 census it has a population of 2,840, up from 1,765 in 1998, with an annual growth rate of 5.0%, the second highest in the province (behind Hassi Fehal).

Climate

Mansoura has a hot desert climate (Köppen climate classification BWh), with very hot summers and mild winters, and very little precipitation throughout the year.

Transportation
Mansoura lies on the Trans-Sahara Highway (also known as the N1 national highway) just north of the town of Hassi Fehal. The highway connects to Ghardaïa to the north, and El Goléa and In Salah to the south.

Education

3.9% of the population has a tertiary education (the equal lowest in the province), and another 12.9% has completed secondary education. The overall literacy rate is 72.5%, and is 77.6% among males and 66.6% among females; all three figures are the second lowest in the province behind Hassi Fehal.

Localities
The commune of Mansoura is composed of two localities:

El Mansoura
Aïn Loussig et Chouikat Sud

References

Neighbouring towns and cities

Communes of Ghardaïa Province
Algeria
Cities in Algeria